John Fitzwilliam Stairs, also known as John Fitz William Stairs (January 19, 1848 – September 26, 1904) was an entrepreneur and statesman, born in Halifax, Nova Scotia, a member of the prominent Stairs family of merchants and shippers founded by William Machin Stairs (1789–1865) that included the Victorian era explorer, William Grant Stairs.

Known as "John F.", he studied at Dalhousie University and then entered the management of the family's vast business empire. He was elected to the Nova Scotia House of Assembly in 1879, resigning in 1882 to successfully run for election to the House of Commons of Canada in Ottawa where he served as a Conservative Party member until 1896.

Stairs was president of many companies, including Nova Scotia Steel, Eastern Trust, Trinidad Electric (B.W.I.) and Royal Securities Corporation. He served as director of the Dartmouth and Halifax Steamboat Company, Nova Scotia Sugar Refining, the Union Bank of Halifax, Consumer Cordage, and during his lifetime, came to dominate the financial elite of the Maritime provinces.

He also employed Max Aitken (later, Lord Beaverbrook) at the beginning of Aitken's business career, hiring him in 1902 when he set up Royal Securities, the first investment firm in Eastern Canada. Max Aitken was at Stairs' bedside when he died in Toronto, Ontario.  His remains were sent to Halifax where he was buried in the Fairview Cemetery.

Electoral history

References 
 Frost, James. Merchant Princes, Halifax's First Family of Finance, Ships and Steel. (2003 - James Lorimer & Co.)

External links 
Biography at the Dictionary of Canadian Biography Online

1848 births
1904 deaths
Canadian people of American descent
Canadian businesspeople
Stock and commodity market managers
Conservative Party of Canada (1867–1942) MPs
Members of the House of Commons of Canada from Nova Scotia
Progressive Conservative Association of Nova Scotia MLAs
People from Halifax, Nova Scotia
Burials at the Cimetière du Grand Jas
Nova Scotia political party leaders